Nadiya Billova (born 2 September 1961) is a Ukrainian former biathlete and biathlon coach. She competed in the women's individual event at the 1994 Winter Olympics. She also previously competed at the 1986 Biathlon World Championships for the Soviet Union, where she was part of the gold medal-winning Soviet women's relay team, and also took the silver in the sprint competition. After retiring from competition she embarked on a career as a coach, becoming one of the few female biathlon coaches working at the elite level: she has had spells coaching the Ukrainian women's and men's teams, as well as the Polish women's team. During her time with the Ukrainian women's team she coached the squad alongside her husband, Roman Bondaruk. She was named the Polish Olympic Committee's Coach of the Year in 2006 and coached the Ukrainian women's team to success at the 2014 Winter Olympics, where they took the gold medal in the relay and Vita Semerenko also took the bronze in the sprint. In May 2019 the Polish Biathlon Association announced that Billova had been forced to leave her role as the Polish women's team coach after a year due to health reasons.

References

External links
 

1961 births
Living people
Biathletes at the 1994 Winter Olympics
Soviet female biathletes
Ukrainian female biathletes
Olympic biathletes of Ukraine
Cross-country skiing coaches
Honoured Masters of Sport of the USSR
Ukrainian sports coaches
Sportspeople from Kherson Oblast